Tsagaan Battsetseg (born 30 January 1972) is a Mongolian and American chess player who holds the FIDE title of Woman International Master (WIM, 1990). She is an eight-time winner of the Mongolian Women's Chess Championship (1989, 1990, 1992, 1994, 1995, 1996, 1997).

Biography
From the end of the 1980s to the end of the 1990s Tsagaan Battsetseg was one of the leading Mongolian female chess players. She eight times won Mongolian Women's Chess Championship: in 1989, 1990, 1992, 1994, 1995, 1996 and 1997. In 1990, Tsagaan Battsetseg participated in Women's World Chess Championship Interzonal Tournament in Azov where ranked 15th place.

Tsagaan Battsetseg played for Mongolia in the Women's Chess Olympiads:
 In 1990, at first board in the 29th Chess Olympiad (women) in Novi Sad (+8, =3, -3),
 In 1994, at first board in the 31st Chess Olympiad (women) in Moscow (+4, =5, -4).
 In 1996, at first board in the 32nd Chess Olympiad (women) in Yerevan (+6, =2, -5),
 In 1998, at first board in the 33rd Chess Olympiad (women) in Elista (+3, =4, -5).

In 1990, she was awarded the FIDE Woman International Master (WIM) title.

Since the beginning of 2000, Tsagaan Battsetseg moved to the United States. In 2009, she participated in U.S. Women's Chess Championship final.

References

External links
 
 
 
 
 

1972 births
Living people
Mongolian female chess players
American female chess players
Chess Woman International Masters
Chess Olympiad competitors
21st-century American women